Joachim Werner may refer to:
 Joachim Werner (archaeologist) (1909–1994), German archaeologist and scholar
 Joachim Werner (rower) (born 1939), German Olympic rower